Rafael Sotomayor Baeza (13 September 1823  – 20 May 1880) was a Chilean lawyer and politician. As Minister of War and Navy he was the main organiser of Chilean forces during the War of the Pacific. He died of a stroke while on campaign.

References

1823 births
1880 deaths
19th-century Chilean lawyers
19th-century Chilean politicians
Chilean military personnel of the War of the Pacific